The Tourism Infrastructure and Enterprise Zone Authority (TIEZA), formerly the Philippine Tourism Authority, is an agency of the Philippine national government under the Department of Tourism responsible for implementing policies and programs of the department pertaining to the development, promotion, and supervision of tourism projects in the Philippines.

Republic Act No. 9593 or "The Tourism Act of 2009" declares a national policy for tourism as an engine of investment, employment, growth and national development, and strengthening the Department of Tourism and its attached agencies to effectively and efficiently implement that policy, and appropriating fund thereof.

The Act supports the establishment of Tourism Enterprise Zones (TEZs) established to be the centers of tourism development in the country. TIEZA is mandated to designate, regulate and supervise the TEZs established under this Act, as well as develop, manage and supervise tourism infrastructure projects in the country.

The TIEZA is governed a board of directors (TIEZA Board) composed of Tourism Department Secretary, the TIEZA Chief Operating Officer, the Tourism Promotion Board Chief Operating Officer, the Department of Public Work and Highways Secretary, the Department of Environmental and Natural Resources Secretary, the Department of Internal and Local Government Secretary, and five (5) representative directors that will be recommended by the Tourism Congress.

As the infrastructure arm of DOT, TIEZA has been managing and operating several establishments. Among those operational are: 
 Banaue Hotel and Youth Hostel
 Hilaga Northern Philippines Village (or Paskuhan Village)
 Club Intramuros Golf Course
 Rizal Lights and Sounds Museum
 Balicasag Island Dive Resort
 Gardens of Malasag Mountain Resort
 Zamboanga Golf Course and Beach Park
 Boracay Water Drainage Program
 Corregidor Island breakwater reconstruction

TIEZA derives 50% of the share of travel taxes collected in the Philippines. Due to the COVID-19 pandemic in the Philippines, the agency experienced reduced collection when compared to the pre-pandemic year of 2019.

References

External links
TIEZA homepage

Department of Tourism (Philippines)
Government-owned and controlled corporations of the Philippines